The Sex Life of the Polyp is a 1928 short film written and performed by Robert Benchley, based on a routine he first did in 1922.  The short, which was adapted from an essay by Benchley, documents a dim-witted doctor attempting to discuss the sex life of a polyp to a women's club. This was the second of Benchley's 46 comedy short films, with six made for Fox, one each for Universal Pictures and RKO Radio Pictures, 29 for Metro-Goldwyn-Mayer, and nine for Paramount Pictures.

The film, made in the then-new Fox Movietone sound-on-film process, was a success and was later included in the compilation Robert Benchley and the Knights of the Algonquin.

In 2007, the film was selected for preservation in the United States National Film Registry by the Library of Congress as being "culturally, historically, or aesthetically significant".

Further reading 
 Maltin, Leonard, Selected Short Subjects. (CreateSpace Independent Publishing Platform, 2015) 
Billy Altman, Laughter's Gentle Soul: The Life of Robert Benchley. (New York City: W. W. Norton, 1997)

External links
The Sex Life of the Polyp essay  by Steve Massa at National Film Registry

 
 The Sex Life of the Polyp essay by Daniel Eagan in America's Film Legacy: The Authoritative Guide to the Landmark Movies in the National Film Registry, A&C Black, 2010 , pages 142-144

References 

1928 films
1928 comedy films
1920s English-language films
American black-and-white films
United States National Film Registry films
1928 short films
American comedy short films
1920s American films